Putative homeodomain transcription factor 2 is a protein that in humans is encoded by the PHTF2 gene.

References

Further reading